Graphical unitary group approach (GUGA) is a technique 
used to construct Configuration state functions (CSFs) in 
computational quantum chemistry.  As reflected in its name, the 
method uses the mathematical properties of the unitary group.

The foundation of the unitary group approach (UGA) can be traced to the work of 
Moshinsky. Later, 
Shavitt
introduced the graphical aspect (GUGA) drawing on the earlier work of 
Paldus.

Computer programs based on the GUGA method have been shown to be
highly efficient. 

offering certain performance advantages over the older, sometimes 
called traditional, techniques for CSF construction. However traditional methods can offer other 
advantages such 

References

External links 
 Documentation for GUGA input to the GAMESS program

Quantum chemistry
Theoretical chemistry